Weigl is a German surname. Notable people with the surname include:

Bruce Weigl, American poet
Joseph Weigl, Austrian composer and conductor
Julian Weigl, German footballer
Karl Weigl, Austrian composer
Rudolf Weigl, Polish biologist
Vally Weigl, Austrian composer

See also
Weigel

German-language surnames